The 1954–55 Drexel Dragons men's basketball team represented Drexel Institute of Technology during the 1954–55 men's basketball season. The Dragons, led by 3rd year head coach Samuel Cozen, played their home games at Sayre High School and were members of the College–Southern division of the Middle Atlantic Conferences (MAC).

The team finished the season 14–5, and finished in 1st place in the MAC in the regular season.

Roster

Schedule

|-
!colspan=9 style="background:#F8B800; color:#002663;"| Regular season
|-

Awards

John Loomis
MAC Southern All-Conference Team

Bob Buckley
MAC Southern All-Conference Team

Richard Walker
MAC Southern All-Conference Team

References

Drexel Dragons men's basketball seasons
Drexel
1954 in sports in Pennsylvania
1955 in sports in Pennsylvania